Ryan Seaman (born November 6, 1982) is an American professional stock car racing driver. He was a competitor in what is now the ARCA Menards Series East during the 2000s decade, driving all but one race in his 39 starts in that series for his family team, ERS Motorsports. Seaman also made two NASCAR Truck Series starts in 2008, three NASCAR Whelen Modified Tour starts between 2003 and 2005, and attempted to make an ARCA Re/Max Series start in 2008.

Personal life
Seaman married his wife Melissa in November 2005. He and his family live in Toms River, New Jersey.

Motorsports career results

NASCAR
(key) (Bold – Pole position awarded by qualifying time. Italics – Pole position earned by points standings or practice time. * – Most laps led.)

Craftsman Truck Series

Camping World East Series

ARCA Re/Max Series
(key) (Bold – Pole position awarded by qualifying time. Italics – Pole position earned by points standings or practice time. * – Most laps led.)

References

External links
 

1982 births
Living people
People from Toms River, New Jersey
Sportspeople from Ocean County, New Jersey
Racing drivers from New Jersey
NASCAR drivers
ARCA Menards Series drivers